Peter Ginn is a British archaeologist, best known as a presenter of the BBC educational television documentary series (2005–2014) known as the BBC historic farm series. Ginn and Ruth Goodman were the only presenters to appear in every Farm series, although he did not appear in the related Victorian Pharmacy. His later television work includes Secrets of the Castle (2014) and Full Steam Ahead (2016).

Ginn grew up in Bodicote, Oxfordshire, and went to St John's RC Primary and Blessed George Napier Schools in Banbury. He studied Egyptian archaeology at the Institute of Archaeology, University College London. Ginn was added to the cast of the 2005 series Tales from the Green Valley when his university friend Alex Langlands was injured.

References

External links

Living people
People from Banbury
British television presenters
1978 births
British archaeologists
21st-century archaeologists
Alumni of University College London